Nikolai Vladimirovich Mylnikov (born 13 September 1977) is a Russian professional football official and a former player. He works as an administrator for the Under-21 squad of FC Orenburg.

Club career
He played in the Russian Football National League for FC Uralmash Yekaterinburg in 1997.

References

1977 births
Living people
Russian footballers
Association football midfielders
FC Ural Yekaterinburg players
FC Orenburg players
FC Uralets Nizhny Tagil players